The Orsini Altarpiece, Orsini Polyptych or Passion Polyptych is a painting produced at an unknown location by Simone Martini for private devotion by a cardinal of the Orsini family. Its precise date is still under discussion. It was taken to France very early in its lifespan and formed a major influence on late medieval French artists. It is now split between the Louvre, the Royal Museum of Fine Arts, Antwerp and the Gemäldegalerie.

On the back of the Louvre panel (Christ Bearing the Cross) is the coat of arms of the Orsini family. It shows the man who commissioned the painting dressed as a cardinal at the foot of the cross. Some art historians see him as a portrait of the Roman cardinal Napoleone Orsini, who owned a fragment of the True Cross, which may explain the choice of subject. Under this hypothesis, he commissioned it before leaving Rome for the papal court in Avignon or in Avignon itself, where Martini followed Orsini. 

It was probably in the Champmol Charterhouse, near Dijon, by the end of the 14th century. It was still there in the prior's chambers in 1791, when it was sold and split up. The four panels in Antwerp (Crucifixion, Descent from the Cross, The Archangel Gabriel and Virgin of the Annunciation) were sold in Dijon in 1826 and acquired for the collection of Florent van Ertborn, mayor of Antwerp - they were originally two panels, with Gabriel and Virgin on the reverse of the other two panels, before they were later sawn off. The Louvre panel (Christ Bearing the Cross) was bought from a man named L. Saint-Denis in 1834. The Berlin panel (Entombment) was bought from the Paris art dealer Émile Pacully in 1904. Originally, it had the same golden background as the other panels, but this was painted over in red, probably in the middle of the 15th century.

Reconstruction
When open, the altarpiece had four scenes of Christ's Passion on one side, from left to right Christ Bearing the Cross (Louvre), Crucifixion (Antwerp), Descent from the Cross (Antwerp) and Entombment (Berlin). On the reverse of the two central panels were the two annunciation panels, now in Antwerp. On the reverse of one of the outer panels, Christ Bearing the Cross, is the coat of arms of the Orsini family. The Berlin panel probably had the same on its reverse, but this is now lost through subsequent alterations of the panel.

Bibliography
 Victor M. Schmidt, Painted piety: panel paintings for personal devotion in Tuscany, ca.1250-1400, Florence, Centro Di, coll. « Italia e Paesi Bassi », 2005, p. 256-260
 Joel Brink, « Cardinal Napoleone Orsini and Chiara della Croce: A Note on the "Monache" in Simone Martini's "Passion Altarpiece" », Zeitschrift für Kunstgeschichte, no 46. Bd., H. 4, 1983, p. 419-424

References

1330s paintings
Paintings by Simone Martini
Paintings in the Louvre by Italian artists
Paintings in the Gemäldegalerie, Berlin
Paintings in the collection of the Royal Museum of Fine Arts Antwerp
Paintings depicting the Passion of Jesus
Paintings depicting the Crucifixion of Jesus
Paintings depicting the Annunciation